Fastmail is an email hosting company based in Melbourne, Australia. In addition to its Fastmail-branded services, the company also operates Topicbox, a mailing list service, and Pobox, an email service it acquired in 2015.

The company was acquired by Opera Software in 2010 but became independent again in 2013 through a staff buyout. Its servers are located in Bridgewater, New Jersey and Seattle, Washington.

History

Fastmail was founded in 1999 by Rob Mueller, Bruce Davey, and Jeremy Howard, to provide email service for customers of the Optimal Decisions Group.

The provider's sole product line is email services (and included accessories), but it was owned by Opera Software (best known for its web browser) from 2010 to 2013. Through a staff buyout, the company became fully independent again.

On 18 October 2012 Fastmail announced that new signups for the free service level had been discontinued. Existing free Fastmail accounts would not be discontinued, but if a free account was deactivated because it was not logged into in over 120 days, it would not be reactivated. The company stated that they had decided to focus Fastmail as a "premium brand" with only paid accounts.

When first established, the service was intended to differentiate itself through providing features that were not yet available from other market players.  Early on, this included the ease and speed of email transport and access, personalities and IMAP and SSL support, and an independent public forum and wiki among user support options. Over the years, these features became commonplace, but features such as WebDAV, secure LDAP, opportunistic inter-server encryption, reliability via minimization of single points of failure, and customizable filtering via Sieve are current differentiators.

In 2003, mail servers were moved under the domain name messagingengine.com.

On October 23, 2014, Fastmail moved their primary domain from fastmail.fm to fastmail.com.

All existing "guest" and "one-time payment" member email accounts were discontinued on July 31, 2017 as Fastmail transitioned into a subscription-only email service. Existing users were given the option to subscribe to Fastmail with a discount or to request a refund of their one-time payment.

As of December 2018, Fastmail and all other Australian companies are subject to the Assistance and Access Bill, which compels them to assist law enforcement in accessing encrypted communications if warranted during an investigation. Fastmail stated that while their services were not "materially affected" since they already complied with warrants per the Telecommunications Act, concerns have been shown by customers over the bill's effects.

On June 24, 2019, Fastmail launched refreshed look, with a new logo, app icon, colors, and website. The logo now reads "Fastmail" instead of "FastMail".

Features 
Fastmail offers multiple domains (all but one of them starting with "Fastmail", and then different top-level domains) which users can choose from, while also allowing customers to use their own domain. Users are also able to create calendars and notes in the web mail environment and sync them over the IMAP and CalDav protocols.

Technology 
The site developers are among active contributors to the widely used Cyrus IMAP open source software project and include the lead developer and maintainer of Perl module Mail::IMAPTalk.
Fastmail supported the development of the free software webmail interface Roundcube and developed JMAP – a new open email protocol.

Fastmail also provides for two-factor login using a YubiKey. While associating one or more YubiKeys with a Fastmail account will not prevent normal logins, it allowed for logging on to an email account with just a YubiKey and its auto-generated one-time passwords, making it suitable for accessing email on public machines. The YubiKey-only login feature was discontinued in July 2016, as it was rarely used, according to the Fastmail team.

The email service also supports the U2F and the TOTP protocol as a secondary sign-in factor, allowing users to sign in with their password and a security token as an extra security feature.

See also
 Comparison of webmail providers

References

External links
 

Webmail
Computer-related introductions in 1999
Companies based in Melbourne